Adam Doyle is an Australian former professional rugby league footballer who played in the 1990s. He played for Western Suburbs in the ARL and for Warrington in the Super League.

Playing career
Doyle made his first grade debut for Western Suburbs in round 3 of the 1997 ARL season against South Sydney. Doyle scored a try in Wests 17-8 loss at the Sydney Football Stadium. Doyle played a total of 16 games for the club throughout the year mainly at five-eighth as Western Suburbs narrowly missed the finals. In 1998, Doyle signed for English side Warrington and played a total of 14 games with the club finishing in 10th place.

References

1978 births
Western Suburbs Magpies players
Warrington Wolves players
Australian rugby league players
Rugby league five-eighths
Living people